Cold blood may refer to:
sang froid, ruthlessness, see Conscience
 a classification for draft or pack horses, see horse breed
 Coldblood a Marvel Comics villain
 "Cold Blood" (Doctor Who), an episode of the British TV series Doctor Who
 Cold Blood (TV series), a UK crime drama series

Music
 Cold Blood (band), an American rock/jazz/soul band formed in 1968
 Cold Blood (album), their debut album
 "Cold Blood" (Yo Gotti song), a song by rapper Yo Gotti featuring J. Cole
"Cold Blood", song by Geraldine Hunt	1972
"Cold Blood", song by Kix from Blow My Fuse	1988
"Cold Blood", song by Peter Tosh from Wanted Dread & Alive	1981

See also
Cold-blooded (disambiguation)
In Cold Blood (disambiguation)